Gavin Edwards  (born 1968) is an American journalist and non-fiction writer.  He is the author of 13 books, including the biographies Last Night at the Viper Room: River Phoenix and the Hollywood He Left Behind, The Tao of Bill Murray: Real-Life Stories of Joy, Enlightenment, and Party Crashing and Bad Motherfucker:The Life and Movies of Samuel L. Jackson, the Coolest Man in Hollywood.   Edwards has written for Rolling Stone, The New York Times, and  Wired, among other publications.

Biography
Edwards was born in New York to Scilla and James Edwards. He graduated from Yale University in 1990 with a BA in English.

Focused primarily on music, Edwards began working as a contributing editor and associate editor at Details in 1991.  In 1999, he began writing for Rolling Stone, where, as a contributing editor, he has written 12 cover stories.

Edwards published his first book of misheard lyrics in 1995.  Titled  'Scuse Me While I Kiss This Guy, it was published by Touchstone Books. Can I Say: Living Large, Cheating Death, and Drums, Drums, Drums, which Edwards wrote with Travis Barker, was released in October 2015.

Edwards' 2016 book, The Tao of Bill Murray, consisted of a brief biography of Bill Murray, a 106-page filmography of 59 films, and a breakdown of the "10 Principles of Bill," a "kind of existentialist/Zen mashup that preaches a heightened awareness of the present."

Edwards and his wife,  curator Jennifer Sudul Edwards, live in Charlotte, North Carolina with their two sons.

Bibliography
 Bad Motherfucker: The Life and Movies of Samuel L. Jackson, the Coolest Man in Hollywood; Hachette; October 2021; 
 Kindness and Wonder: Why Mister Rogers Matters Now More Than Ever; Dey St.; October 2019; 
 The World According to Tom Hanks: The Life, the Obsessions, the Good Deeds of America's Most Decent Guy; Grand Central Publishing; October 2018; 
 The Beautiful Book of Exquisite Corpses: A Creative Game of Limitless Possibilities; Penguin Books, August 2018 
 The Tao of Bill Murray: Real-Life Stories of Joy, Enlightenment, and Party Crashing; Random House; September 2016.  
 Can I Say: Living Large, Cheating Death, and Drums Drums Drums (by Travis Barker with Gavin Edwards); HarperCollins; October 2015
 Last Night at the Viper Room: River Phoenix and the Hollywood He Left Behind; It Books; October 2013
 VJ: The Unplugged Adventures of MTV's First Wave (with Nina Blackwood, Mark Goodman, Alan Hunter, Martha Quinn); Atria Books; May 2013
 Is Tiny Dancer Really Elton's Little John?: Music's Most Enduring Mysteries, Myths, and Rumors Revealed; Three Rivers Press; August 2006
 Deck the Halls with Buddy Holly: And Other Misheard Christmas Lyrics; HarperPerennial; October 1998
 When a Man Loves a Walnut: And Even More Misheard Lyrics; Fireside; November 1997
 He's Got the Whole World in his Pants: And More Misheard Lyrics; Fireside; November 1996
  'Scuse Me While I Kiss This Guy: And Other Misheard Lyrics; Fireside; April 1995

References

Writers from New York (state)
Living people
20th-century American writers
21st-century American writers
1968 births